Rodolfo Gómez (born 9 August 1946) is a Nicaraguan long-distance runner. He competed in the marathon at the 1972 Summer Olympics.

References

1946 births
Living people
Athletes (track and field) at the 1972 Summer Olympics
Nicaraguan male long-distance runners
Nicaraguan male marathon runners
Olympic athletes of Nicaragua
Place of birth missing (living people)